The Çukurova State Symphony Orchestra is a symphony orchestra located in Adana, Turkey. It was founded in 1988 after the Turkish Presidency Symphony Orchestra, Istanbul and İzmir State Symphony Orchestras. It performed its first concert on January 5, 1992 at the Metropolitan Theatre Hall, and has performed there at various occasions since then.  Its principal conductor is Emin Güven Yaslıcam.

External links
Çukurova State Symphony Orchestra 

Culture in Adana
Turkish symphony orchestras
Musical groups established in 1988
Ministry of Culture and Tourism (Turkey)
Symphony orchestras